Talent Unlimited High School is a public high school of the performing arts located on the Upper East Side of Manhattan in New York City.

History
The school started as a pilot program in January 1973. Students took academic courses at their home high schools and attended Talent Unlimited in the afternoons.  The director of the program was John Motley, conductor of the All City High School Chorus.  The music teaching staff included Arlene Lieberman, Robert Vitale, H. L. Smith, II, Camilla Williams and Fred Norman.  This first class performed at Gracie Mansion for Mayor John V. Lindsay and Marian Anderson.

Programs 
Talent Unlimited High School educates in five performing arts fields: Vocal Music, Musical Theatre, Acting, Dance, and Instrumental Music. These programs are taught by well experienced teachers and guest artists, that have worked in their fields for over 10 years.

Campus
It is within the Julia Richman Education Complex along with five other schools: Urban Academy, Vanguard High School, P226M Junior High Annex, Ella Baker Elementary School, and Manhattan International High School.

Extracurricular activities
The Talent Unlimited Choir has appeared on the WCBS show "Holiday in Bryant Park" in 2007 and 2008.  They backed up Broadway singers Norm Lewis and Carolee Carmello in 2007, and Broadway actor Cheyenne Jackson and cabaret singer Michael Feinstein in 2008.  They also performed in December 2009 on the NCM/Fathom special "The Christmas Sweater - The Road to Redemption," which aired live from Skirball Center for the Performing Arts in New York City and was hosted by Glenn Beck.

Notable alumni
Stephanie Andujar, actress/singer/dancer
Julissa Bermudez
Angela Bofill, singer/songwriter
Deemi, singer/songwriter
Mos Def, actor/comedian
Laurence Fishburne, actor/producer
Corey Glover, singer/actor
Kadeem Hardison, actor/director
Edward W. Hardy, composer/violinist
Solomon Hicks, guitar player, blues singer
Lisa Lisa (born Lisa Velez), singer/musician
Anthony Ortiz, singer/founder TKA
Gene Anthony Ray, actor/dancer
Derrick Simmons, director/stunt actor
Brenda K. Starr, singer/songwriter
Julius P Williams, composer, conductor, first African American president of the Conductors Guild
Todd Williams, actor
Malik Yoba, actor/singer
Keith Rogers, Photographer/Musician/Computer Programmer

References

External links
Talent Unlimited High School https://www.broadwayworld.com/people/Maxwell-Vice/

Public high schools in Manhattan
Schools of the performing arts in the United States